Marilyn, released in the United States as Roadhouse Girl, is a 1953 British film noir directed by Wolf Rilla starring Sandra Dorne and Maxwell Reed.

The film is based on James M. Cain's novel The Postman Always Rings Twice.

Plot
Drifter  mechanic Tom Price (Reed) lusts after seductive Marilyn (Dorne), the young wife of ill-tempered garage owner George Saunders (Dwyer). Assuming (correctly) that Marilyn is fooling around with his employee, Saunders angrily confronts him.  Defending himself, Tom accidentally kills his boss. Marilyn helps him to cover up the crime - the inquest verdict is "accidental death" - and Marilyn begins a new life, while also keeping Tom at a distance.
Several months later she is running a just-getting-by "American bar". Wealthy businessman Nicky Everton (Mayne) agrees to lend her some money, believing that Marilyn will offer her affections as repayment. Everton later changes his mind as he feels they won't be happy in the longer term; and Price also walks out, frustrated by her erratic behaviour and in particular her lack of lasting commitment to him.   Throughout all this, Rosie, Marilyn's maid, has kept the dark secret of Saunders' death to herself, until she is taken for granted once too often by her self-centred boss. Marilyn is left alone with her hopes and fears.

Cast
 Sandra Dorne as Marilyn Saunders
 Maxwell Reed as Tom Price
 Leslie Dwyer as George Saunders
 Vida Hope as Rosie
 Ferdy Mayne as Nicky Everton
 Hugh Pryse as Coroner
 Kenneth Connor as Customer in Roadhouse 
 Ben Williams as Jury Foreman

Critical reception
Marilyn was selected by film historians Steve Chibnall and Brian McFarlane as one of the 15 most meritorious British B films made between World War II and 1970. The authors note that it is "symptomatic of a transatlantic turn in the British 'B'" and praise its depiction of a "pervasive sense of dissatisfaction with things as they are".

References

External links
 
 

1953 films
British crime drama films
1953 crime drama films
Films directed by Wolf Rilla
Film noir
Films produced by Ernest G. Roy
British black-and-white films
1950s English-language films
1950s British films